Bellon or Bellón is a surname. Notable people with the surname include:

Damian Bellón (born 1989), Swiss footballer
Juan Manuel Bellón López (born 1950), Spanish chess grandmaster
Maia Bellon, American lawyer and environmentalist  
Pierre Bellon (1930-2022), French businessman
Roger Bellon (born 1953), French composer
Sophie Bellon (born 1961), French businesswoman
Yagó Bellón (born 1989), Swiss footballer
David A. Bellon  (born 1970), American Lawyer and Politician